Uganda made its Paralympic Games début at the 1972 Summer Paralympics in Heidelberg, West Germany - shortly after Idi Amin's rise to power.

Background 
Uganda made their Paralympic debut at the 1972 Summer Paralympics in Heidelberg, West Germany.

Team 
Uganda sent a two sportspeople strong delegation to the Games.

Athletics 

The country entered only two athletes, who both competed in men's javelin and shot put. Neither of them won a medal.

See also
 Uganda at the 1972 Summer Olympics

References

External links
International Paralympic Committee official website

Nations at the 1972 Summer Paralympics
1972
Paralympics